The Battle of Ferozeshah was fought on 21 December and 22 December 1845 between the British East India Company and the Sikh Empire, at the village of Ferozeshah in Punjab. The British were led by Sir Hugh Gough and Governor-General Sir Henry Hardinge, while the Sikhs were led by Lal Singh. The British emerged victorious.

Background
The First Anglo-Sikh War broke out as a result of the Sikh Empire of the Punjab falling into disorder after the death of the Maharajah Ranjit Singh in 1839, and British desire to secure the Punjab. The Sikh army, the Khalsa, was goaded by some of the contenders for power in the Punjab and its own ambitions for plunder and glory into crossing the Sutlej River into British territory.

Moves prior to the battle
A British division was already stationed at Ferozepur, and a large army under the Commander-in-Chief of the Bengal Army, Sir Hugh Gough, accompanied by the Governor General, was already marching from the various stations around Delhi toward the frontier. While a detachment of the Sikh army under its commander in chief, Tej Singh, advanced on Ferozepur, the main force under Vizier Lal Singh advanced to confront Gough. On 18 December, Lal Singh's advance guard was defeated at the untidy encounter Battle of Mudki.

Gough's army itself was hard-hit and tired by the battle, and made no move on the next day, or the day after. This allowed Lal Singh's army to concentrate at Ferozeshah and fortify its encampment.

Early on 21 December, Gough's army advanced, and came into sight of the Sikh encampment late in the morning. Gough wished to attack immediately. Hardinge thought the odds against the British were too great, and wished to wait for the division from Ferozepur, under Major General Littler, to join the attack. Eventually, Hardinge used his civil appointment as Governor General to overrule Gough.

The battle

First Day
Littler's division appeared in the late afternoon, and deployed on the left of the British line. (The right division was under Major General Sir Walter Gilbert, and a smaller division under Sir Harry Smith was in reserve.)

Gough attacked at about 3:30 pm, on the shortest day of the year. The battle was opened by the British guns moving forward to open a preparatory bombardment. This proved ineffectual. Not only were the Sikh guns more numerous and protected by parapets and entrenchments, they were also far heavier than the British guns, many of which were light guns of the Bengal Horse Artillery. Gough's heavy 18-pounder guns had been left behind at Mudki.

As the artillery duelled, the British and Bengal infantry advanced. General Littler came under heavy fire, and believed only a rush with the bayonet would save his division from annihilation by the Sikh guns. Three of his Bengal regiments held back (being short of water and ammunition), while one of his British regiments (the 62nd Foot) lost almost half its men and was driven back. Part of General Gilbert's division broke into the Sikh encampment, but his own right flank was threatened by large numbers of Sikh irregular cavalry. The Sikh horsemen were driven back by a British cavalry regiment, the 3rd Light Dragoons.

As darkness fell, Sir Harry Smith's division launched a renewed attack, which overran several Sikh batteries and penetrated into the midst of the Sikh camp, around the village of Ferozeshah itself, before being driven back by counter-attacks. Fierce fighting continued until midnight. Many casualties were caused on both sides as a Sikh magazine exploded.

Second Day
Both the British and Sikhs were mixed up in disorder. Gough and Hardinge tried to reform their troops, while keeping up encouraging banter. In fact, Hardinge expected defeat the next day. He sent word to the camp at Mudki that the state papers in his baggage were to be burned in this event, and gave his sword (a spoil of war which had once belonged to Napoleon Bonaparte) to his aide-de-camp.

When dawn broke, it became clear that the British held most of the camp, and had captured seventy-one guns. Reforming their line, Gough and Hardinge advanced north-west and by noon they had driven Lal Singh's army from the field, in spite of heavy losses from the remaining Sikh artillery.

Even as the British were congratulating themselves, they became aware that Tej Singh's army was approaching from the west. Gough's troops were already exhausted and almost out of ammunition. As they formed up again, and came under fire from Tej Singh's guns, a capitulation was seriously considered, to spare the wounded from massacre.

Gough's army was saved when, ironically, some of his horse artillery ran out of ammunition. A staff officer ordered them to withdraw to Ferozepur to replenish, and also ordered much of the British cavalry to escort them. Tej Singh claimed that the movement was an outflanking manoeuvre, and ordered a withdrawal to the north.

Aftermath
While the Sikhs temporarily withdrew over the Sutlej, Gough's army camped immediately north of the battlefield. They suffered from the stench of the many dead, and many men became ill through drinking from polluted wells. One seventh of the army had been casualties. Hardinge privately criticised Gough's head-on tactics and sought to have him replaced, but no formal change of command could take place for several weeks, by which time events made it unnecessary.

The staff officer whose apparent blunder in sending the guns and cavalry away on the second day had actually saved Gough, a Captain Lumley who was the son of a General, was judged to have been driven temporarily insane by exhaustion and heatstroke and allowed to resign his commission, rather than face a court-martial.

On the Sikh side, there was temporary dismay and much recrimination. It was evident that both Lal Singh and Tej Singh were ineffective and potentially treasonous commanders. Both were Dogras rather than Sikhs, and were prominent in the faction which was seeking to curtail the power of the Sikh Khalsa Army to intervene in the Durbar (court and government) of the Punjab. Lal Singh was alleged to have sheltered in a ditch throughout the battle, and although this cannot be proved, it is clear that he took little active part. Tej Singh had used the thinnest pretext to order a retreat when most of his officers and troops were eager to fall on the exhausted British and Bengal armies.

Order of battle

British Army regiments
3rd King’s Own Light Dragoons
9th Foot
29th Foot
31st Foot
50th Foot
62nd Foot
80th Foot

Bengal Army regiments
The Governor General’s Bodyguard
4th Bengal Light Cavalry
5th Bengal Light Cavalry
8th Bengal Light Cavalry
Skinner's Horse
8th Irregular Cavalry
9th Irregular Cavalry
1st Bengal European Light Infantry
2nd Bengal Native Infantry
12th Bengal Native Infantry
14th Bengal Native Infantry
16th Bengal Native Infantry
24th Bengal Native Infantry
26th Bengal Native Infantry
33rd Bengal Native Infantry
42nd Bengal Native Infantry
44th Bengal Native Infantry
45th Bengal Native Infantry
47th Bengal Native Infantry

Gallery

Sources
Ian Hernon,. "Britain's forgotten wars", Sutton Publishing, 2003, 
Byron Farwell, "Queen Victoria's little wars", Wordsworth Military Library, 1999,

References

External links
allaboutsikhs.com
BritishBattles.com

Ferozeshah
Ferozeshah
History of Punjab, India
Conflicts in 1845
1845 in India
December 1845 events